Felipe Augusto Ferreira Batista (born 6 March 1992 in Governador Valadares) is a Brazilian professional footballer who plays for CSA.

Career
On 1 December 2015, Felipe Augusto was loaned to Primeira Liga club G.D. Estoril Praia. He made his debut on 10 January 2016 in a home win against C.F. Os Belenenses, and scored his first goal for the Canarinhos when he came off the bench against Vitória S.C. to score the equalizer.

References

External links

1992 births
Living people
Association football forwards
Brazilian footballers
Primeira Liga players
Campeonato Brasileiro Série A players
Campeonato Brasileiro Série B players
Campeonato Brasileiro Série C players
Sociedade Esportiva Palmeiras players
Sertãozinho Futebol Clube players
Esporte Clube Democrata players
Madureira Esporte Clube players
Clube Atlético Linense players
Tupi Football Club players
G.D. Estoril Praia players
Volta Redonda FC players
Paraná Clube players
Botafogo Futebol Clube (SP) players
Mirassol Futebol Clube players
Operário Ferroviário Esporte Clube players
Brazilian expatriate footballers
Brazilian expatriate sportspeople in Portugal
Expatriate footballers in Portugal
Villa Nova Atlético Clube players
América Futebol Clube (MG) players
Cruzeiro Esporte Clube players
Centro Sportivo Alagoano players
People from Governador Valadares
Sportspeople from Minas Gerais